Diane Valkenburg (born 30 August 1984) is a Dutch former speed skater who specialised in middle distances and was born in Bergschenhoek.

She represented her country at the 2007 Winter Universiade held in Turin where she won the gold medal at the team pursuit together with Moniek Kleinsman and Janneke Ensing.

She participated in the 2010 Winter Olympics on 1500 meters, 3000 meters, and 5000 meters.

Personal bests

Source: SpeedskatingResults.com

She is currently in 35th position in the adelskalender.

References

1984 births
Living people
Dutch female speed skaters
Speed skaters at the 2007 Winter Universiade
Medalists at the 2007 Winter Universiade
People from Lansingerland
Speed skaters at the 2010 Winter Olympics
Olympic speed skaters of the Netherlands
World Allround Speed Skating Championships medalists
World Single Distances Speed Skating Championships medalists
Universiade gold medalists for the Netherlands
Universiade medalists in speed skating
Sportspeople from South Holland
21st-century Dutch women